Theodore G. Striphas is an American academic and author of The Late Age of Print.

Career 
Striphas received his PhD from the University of North Carolina at Chapel Hill. He is currently an associate professor of Media Studies in the College of Media, Communication and Information at the University of Colorado Boulder

The Late Age of Print 

The Late Age of Print is Striphas's best-known and best-selling work, published by Columbia University Press. The book discusses technological innovations in printing and publishing, such as Google's book scanning and Amazon's Kindle. In addition, The Late Age of Print discusses the inevitability of the Borders Bookstore bankruptcy and subsequent closure. The book has received generally positive reviews from The Guardian and other sources.

Striphas's blog continues discussion of the critical and technological issues raised in The Late Age of Print. The blog has received praise from Canadian Broadcasting Corporation and other sources.

Awards 

He received the 2010 Book of the Year Award from the National Communication Association's Critical Cultural Studies Division for The Late Age of Print.

References

External links 
 Blog: The Late Age of Print
 Indiana University faculty page
 Department of Communication and Culture faculty page

University of North Carolina at Chapel Hill alumni
Living people
Indiana University faculty
American male writers
Year of birth missing (living people)